Saint-Léger-sous-Cholet (literally Saint-Léger under Cholet) is a commune in the Maine-et-Loire department in western France.

History
Before the French Revolution, the town and the north of the village (Haut-Saint-Léger) depended on Le May-sur-Èvre, the south (Bas-Saint-Léger) on Mortagne-sur-Sèvre.

The town was created by decree of Emperor Napoleon III on December 14, 1863, its territory was then a section of the town of Le May-sur-Evre.

From 1899 to 1947, the town was crossed by the Petit Anjou railway line (Cholet-Nantes, via Beaupréau and Le Loroux-Bottereau) which had a station there.

See also
Communes of the Maine-et-Loire department

References

Saintlegersouscholet